Abhay Shreeniwas Oka (born on 25 May 1960) is a judge of Supreme Court of India. He is former chief justice of Karnataka High Court and judge of the Bombay High Court.

Career 
Oka was born on 25 May 1960. He was enrolled as an advocate on 28 June 1983. He practised for 19 years in the Bombay High Court, appellate side, Bombay in civil, constitutional and service matters and specialised in all the matters.

He was appointed an additional judge of the Bombay High Court on 29 August 2003 and appointed a permanent judge on 12 November 2005.

He was appointed Chief Justice of Karnataka High Court on 30 April 2019 and sworn in as chief justice of the Karnataka High Court on 10 May 2019.

He was elevated as a judge of Supreme Court of India on 26 August 2021 and took oath on 31 August 2021.

References 

1960 births
Living people
21st-century Indian judges
Chief Justices of the Karnataka High Court
Judges of the Bombay High Court
Justices of the Supreme Court of India
University of Mumbai alumni